Gangodawila Soma Thero (24 April 1948 – 12 December 2003) was a bhikkhu (Buddhist monk) from Sri Lanka. Following tradition, he used the name of his birthplace, Gangodawila, in front of his name; thero is a term for an elder monk. Soma thero followed the example set by his teachers, Madihe Pannaseeha Thero and Ampitiye Rahula Maha Thero and was both a learned monk and a social reformer. The cause of his death remains in dispute.

Teachings 
Before his return to Sri Lanka, the knowledge and the practice of the Dhamma had dwindled within Sri Lankan society. The practice had been diminishing for centuries following the rule of King Rajasinghe I. The great Buddhist revival programs had been rejuvenating the practice since the Kandyan kingdom into the mid-20th century. But following civil unrest, political instability, and war during the last 3 decades of the 20th century, the practice was again becoming forgotten. During that crucial time, Soma thero started propagating the Dhamma, creating a new enthusiasm among the people.

He worked to teach Sri Lankan people the importance of diligence. He spoke of the importance of relinquishing sleepiness or "Thina-middha" and paying attention when listening to the Dhamma. He also spoke on the importance of observing the Five Precepts. He emphasized letting go of false views and beliefs, such as worshipping deities over the Buddha.

He also gave worldly advice, such as the importance of learning the English language.

Soma thero was a proponent of vegetarianism and he spoke against killing animals for meat.

Death 
Gangodawila Soma Thera of the Vajiraramaya Maharagama died in St. Petersburg, Russia on 12 December 2003, at age 56. He was in Russia to accept an honorary doctorate conferred by the Russian Government. He was rushed to a hospital in St Petersburg after a heart attack. He underwent two emergency operations.

The circumstances of his death aroused suspicion. Some accused certain political parties of Sri Lanka whilst others accused born again Christians or the Mahamewnawa monastery. A Special Presidential Commission was appointed to investigate this tragedy by President of Sri Lanka.

References

External links 

Sakyamuni Sambuddha Vihara (incl. sermons and videos)
Dhamma Talks
Dhamma Talks

Most Ven Gangodawila Soma Thero MP3 Sermons,E-Books and Videos
Most Ven Gangodawila Soma Thero Dhamma Deshana

Theravada Buddhist monks
Sri Lankan Theravada Buddhists
Sri Lankan Buddhist monks
1948 births
2003 deaths
Alumni of Isipathana College
Sinhalese monks
20th-century Buddhist monks